Luigi Attademo is an Italian classical guitarist born in Naples in 1972.

He worked in the archive of the Fundación Andrés Segovia (in Linares, Jaén, Spain), where he discovered some unknown manuscripts of important composers, such as Jaume Pahissa, Alexandre Tansman, Gaspar Cassadò and others.

References

External links 
Official Homepage
Recordings (with mp3)
Audio (mp3) (musikethos.org) 

Italian classical guitarists
Italian male guitarists
1972 births
Living people
21st-century guitarists
21st-century Italian male musicians